This is a list of airlines currently operating in Guatemala.

See also
 List of defunct airlines of Guatemala
 List of airports in Guatemala

References

Guatemala

Airlines
Airlines
Guatemala